Satyrium tetra, the mountain mahogany hairstreak, is a species of hairstreak in the butterfly family Lycaenidae.

The MONA or Hodges number for Satyrium tetra is 4287.

References

Further reading

 

Eumaeini
Articles created by Qbugbot
Butterflies described in 1870